The Ciolt is a right tributary of the river Chisindia in Romania. It flows into the Chisindia in the village Chisindia.

References

Rivers of Romania
Rivers of Arad County